Lomnička may refer to places:

Lomnička (Brno-Country District) in the Czech Republic
Lomnička (Stará Ľubovňa District) in Slovakia